Nicolás Ignacio Crovetto Aqueveque (born Nicolás Ignacio Corvetto Aqueveque; 15 March 1986) is a Chilean footballer who plays as a left midfielder for Magallanes.

Club career
Crovetto started with his hometown team Coquimbo Unido before signing with Audax Italiano in 2007. After one year in Audax, Crovetto moved to Udinese Calcio. He spent his first six months in Italy without being able to play, however, as he had problems getting a work permit. In January 2009 Crovetto was loaned to Albacete Balompié until end of the season. In April 2009 Audax Italiano claimed that the Italian club owe the transfer fee of the player.

In summer 2009 his EU passport was solved, and he left for Serie B side Triestina. In January 2010 he left for Taranto.

At 28 January 2011, he signed his contract with AEL Limassol until the end of the season. His contract is for five months and AEL Limassol is going to re-new his contract on the end of the season if he shows that he is worthy.

In July 2011 he returned to Coquimbo Unido. In 2012, he signed for Huachipato.

International career
Crovetto was part of the Chile under-23 squad that played the 2008 Toulon Tournament. 

At senior level, he was a substitute of the Chile squad in the friendly match against Spain on 19 November 2008, but he didn't enter.

Personal life
His father, Eduardo Corvetto, is a former president of Coquimbo Unido. His birth surname is Corvetto, but he changed it to Crovetto, originally as his Italian great grandfather, to acquire the Italian citizenship. The surname had been misspelled by the Civil Registry Service of Chile.

Honours
Huachipato
 Primera División de Chile: 2012 Clausura

References

External links
 

1986 births
Living people
People from Coquimbo
Chilean people of Italian descent
Association football midfielders
Chilean footballers
Chilean expatriate footballers
Chile youth international footballers
Coquimbo Unido footballers
Audax Italiano footballers
Udinese Calcio players
Albacete Balompié players
U.S. Triestina Calcio 1918 players
Taranto F.C. 1927 players
AEL Limassol players
C.D. Huachipato footballers
Colo-Colo footballers
F.C. Südtirol players
Deportes Magallanes footballers
Magallanes footballers
Chilean Primera División players
Serie A players
Segunda División players
Serie B players
Serie C players
Cypriot First Division players
Primera B de Chile players
Chilean expatriate sportspeople in Italy
Chilean expatriate sportspeople in Spain
Chilean expatriate sportspeople in Cyprus
Expatriate footballers in Italy
Expatriate footballers in Spain
Expatriate footballers in Cyprus
Citizens of Italy through descent